Hamidou Dia (Saldé, 1953 – February 4, 2018) was a Senegalese writer, literary critic, and philosophy teacher.

He studied philosophy in Dakar and Paris, and achieved a doctorate in French Literature at the University of Laval. He later taught philosophy in the United States, Canada and Senegal.

Works
 Les Sanglots de l'espoir, 1987
 Le Serment, 1987
 Koumbi Saleh ou Les pâturages du ciel, 1993
 Les Remparts de la mémoire, 1999
 Poètes d'Afrique et de Antilles, 2002
 Poésie africaine et engagement, 2002
 L'Écho des jours, 2008 (with a preface by Cheikh Hamidou Kane)
 Présences, 2011
 Aboubakry Kane, le dernier fils de la Grande Royale, 2013 (co-written with Youssouph Mbargane Guissé)

References

1953 births
2018 deaths
20th-century Senegalese writers
Université Laval alumni
21st-century Senegalese writers